Sunday Divine Abalo (born 14 May 1995) is a Nigerian footballer who plays for Lusitano.

References

External links
Sunday Abalo at ZeroZero

1995 births
Sportspeople from Lagos
Living people
Nigerian footballers
Association football midfielders
Rio Ave F.C. players
Nigerian expatriate footballers
Primeira Liga players
Expatriate footballers in Portugal
Leixões S.C. players
Liga Portugal 2 players